The Sonic Palette is a MIDI controller type musical instrument.  It consists of an 84 force sensor note surface, placed within a body that is wearable with a guitar strap.  The body also contains various other controls including two additional force sensors, a tactile switch, and two potentiometers.

The note surface is arrayed seven sensors by twelve sensors and has tactile and visual references.  The note surface is multi-touch or polyphonic, and is capable of sensing absolute finger pressure for each sensor which is can be sent as MIDI velocity and/or continuous controller data like aftertouch.  The sensor array is accessible to both hands.  The note arrangement and controls are user and factory customizable.

The Sonic Palette was invented in 2004 by American Edward Christensen while in Mountain View, California, and is produced by his company, Christensen Controllers, in Hayward, California.

Official site 

U.S. Patent Number 7273979 

Music hardware
Electronic musical instruments
Music of the San Francisco Bay Area